Yves Dimier (born 25 July 1969 in Saint-Jean-de-Maurienne) is a French former alpine skier who competed in the 1994 Winter Olympics.

External links
 sports-reference.com

1969 births
Living people
French male alpine skiers
Olympic alpine skiers of France
Alpine skiers at the 1994 Winter Olympics
People from Saint-Jean-de-Maurienne
Sportspeople from Savoie
20th-century French people